Fujiyama is a steel roller coaster at Fuji-Q Highland, Fujiyoshida, Japan. Fujiyama was also the world's fastest roller coaster for a year of its operation, succeeded by Tower of Terror at Dreamworld theme park in Queensland, Australia, in 1997. Despite being the world's fastest roller coaster in operation for a year, Fujiyama set no world records for roller coaster speed. The Steel Phantom coaster at Kennywood in Pennsylvania, U.S., set the world record for speed before engineers added additional brakes to slow the ride down because of safety and rider comfort concerns.

Name
Fujiyama is named after the iconic Mount Fuji, which stands to the west of Tokyo. The term Fujiyama comes from "fuji", and "yama" which means mountain. Mount Fuji is seldom referred to as "Fujiyama" in the  Japanese language, but is instead more commonly referred to as "Fujisan", using the on'yomi pronunciation of the "mountain" character. The roller coaster Fujiyama is named as a play on the common foreign mistransliteration.

Design
As with many Japanese roller coasters, Fujiyama has a maximum rider age (~64 years old) and a (if an unlimited ride ticket has not been purchased) separate entrance fee (2,000 yen) in addition to the height restrictions typical of any roller coaster.  The layout of Fujiyama is that of a typical out-and-back roller coaster. It incorporates many of the elements that are typical of this coaster design, including a large first drop, "headchopper" elements and a series of small "bunny hills" near the end of the coaster's course.

Reception

Given its record-breaking status, Fujiyama attracted considerable attention when it was built. The ride has been rated positively by some reviewers, garnering 5 stars in Steven Urbanowicz's The Roller Coaster Lover's Companion. Fujiyama did not, however, achieve a listing amongst the top 50 steel roller coaster in Amusement Today's 2009 Golden Ticket Awards.

In medical literature
Fujiyama inadvertently attracted attention in 2000 after an article was published in the journal Neurology. The article discussed the possible relationship between riding roller coasters and the occurrence of subdural hematomas. The primary case study cited by the authors was a woman who had reported severe headaches after riding several roller coasters at Fuji-Q Highland, including Fujiyama. Upon investigation, it was discovered that this woman did in fact have a subdural hematoma. Subsequent research, however, has maintained that this risk remains low and is not unique to this particular coaster.

Records

References

Fuji-Q Highland
Roller coasters introduced in 1996
Roller coasters in Japan